Middle Taylor Township is a township in Cambria County, Pennsylvania, United States. The population was 727 at the 2010 census. It is part of the Johnstown, Pennsylvania Metropolitan Statistical Area.

Geography
The township is located in southwestern Cambria County and is bordered to the south by the city of Johnstown. West Taylor Township is to the west, East Taylor Township is to the east, and Jackson Township is to the north.

Demographics

As of the census of 2000, there were 792 people, 317 households, and 231 families residing in the township.  The population density was 164.6 people per square mile (63.6/km).  There were 331 housing units at an average density of 68.8/sq mi (26.6/km).  The racial makeup of the township was 99.12% White, 0.51% African American, 0.13% Asian, and 0.25% from two or more races. Hispanic or Latino of any race were 1.52% of the population.

There were 317 households, out of which 23.7% had children under the age of 18 living with them, 67.2% were married couples living together, 4.7% had a female householder with no husband present, and 27.1% were non-families. 22.7% of all households were made up of individuals, and 12.0% had someone living alone who was 65 years of age or older.  The average household size was 2.50 and the average family size was 2.98.

In the township the population was spread out, with 18.8% under the age of 18, 7.3% from 18 to 24, 23.9% from 25 to 44, 30.2% from 45 to 64, and 19.8% who were 65 years of age or older.  The median age was 45 years. For every 100 females, there were 99.5 males.  For every 100 females age 18 and over, there were 100.3 males.

The median income for a household in the township was $33,482, and the median income for a family was $37,000. Males had a median income of $31,490 versus $22,895 for females. The per capita income for the township was $15,459.  About 9.1% of families and 8.5% of the population were below the poverty line, including 9.7% of those under age 18 and 17.4% of those age 65 or over.

References

1908 establishments in Pennsylvania
Townships in Cambria County, Pennsylvania
Townships in Pennsylvania